Gibbula joubini is a species of sea snail, a marine gastropod mollusk in the family Trochidae, the top snails.

Description
The size of the shell varies between 2 mm and 5 mm. The rather solid shell has a trochiform shape. It is somewhat, but rather deeply, umbilicated. The conoid spire consists of 6½ somewhat convex whorls with a very pronounced suture. The first two whorls are smooth, the other contain decurrent striae, that are rather sharp and projecting. The growth lines are very narrow and only visible under a lens. The body whorl is bluntly angular at the periphery and almost flat below. The base of the shell contains 5 to 7 concentric ribs.  The aperture is subquadrangular. The columella is almost vertical and is slightly curved upwards, forming almost a right angle with the rim of the base. The lip is simple and curved. The color of the shell is very variable. The main color is whitish with narrow, decurrent, sometimes interrupted black lines. The surface sometimes contains large, longitudinal, brown flames, curved to the right.

Distribution
This species occurs in the Atlantic Ocean off the Western Sahara and Senegal.

References

External links
 To Biodiversity Heritage Library (3 publications)
 To Encyclopedia of Life
 To World Register of Marine Species
 

joubini
Gastropods described in 1910
Invertebrates of West Africa